John Patrick McKenzie (born 1962, Quezon City, Philippines) is an autistic San Francisco-based artist, known for creating works of visual poetry. His works have been exhibited internationally, including in New York, Europe, Australia, and Japan.

About 
McKenzie’s process is based on a complex and mysterious repetitive sequencing. He methodically adds layers of nuance to each chosen subject, which is most often people and objects from pop culture, current events, and the artist’s immediate surroundings. Swirling, multi-angled, and disorienting, the placement of McKenzie’s language comments on the contradictory, sometimes overwhelming, nature of media attention and celebrity.

McKenzie is tirelessly engaged with sorting through the cyclical likes and dislikes of Hollywood, fashion, marketing, and the geo-political. And, like his artwork, the true nature of our information saturated world can be difficult to decode; but, ultimately, what McKenzie’s work reveals is that we are all people, we are all aging, we all like some things and dislike others, and we all need to communicate.

Since 1989, he has been working at Creativity Explored in San Francisco.

Works
McKenzie's works typically are made up of variations on a theme sentence scrawled in black ink on white paper, though he sometimes uses color or writes on other materials. He writes in a stereotyped font in which all letters are filled in. Pop cultural or political icons figure prominently his works, which always feature a repeating prompt, for example:
George Lucas is full of Luke Skywalker They are full of holy Europe
George Lucas is full of Burger King They are full of holy Asia
George Lucas is full of stars They are full of holy Australia
George Lucas if full of movies
George Lucas is full of Streets of San Francisco and Oceania ...

Reception
McKenzie is considered to be a "rising star" in the world of outsider art. His work has been shown around the world, both in group exhibitions of outsider works (for example in Australia) and is solo shows.

Collaborators and collectors

 Tracy Chapman
 Michael Stipe
 UC Berkeley Art Museum

References

External links
 
 Online gallery of McKenzie's works a Brett McDowell Gallery
 "Create" (2011) exhibition at the Berkeley Art Museum and Pacific Film Archive 

1962 births
Living people
Artists from the San Francisco Bay Area
Artists from California
People from Quezon City